Victoria 392 is a 1984 Argentine action-comedy film written, produced, directed and edited by Juan J. Campanella and Fernando Castets in Super 8.

References

External links 

 

1984 films
Argentine comedy films
Films directed by Juan José Campanella
1980s Argentine films